The National Security Strategy (NSS) of India has not been defined since its Independence in 1947. Framing an NSS has remained a major policy goal and challenge of successive Indian governments.

Background 
In 2007, a draft National Security Strategy was prepared by the Integrated Defence Staff, but was not approved by the Cabinet Committee of Security.

The Defence Planning Committee (DPC), a senior decision-making mechanism created In April 2018 by the Central Government of India, according to the notification issued by Indian Government the DPC, will have several mandates including a task to prepare a draft National Security Strategy for India.

In 2019, the Indian National Congress came out with a document 'India's National Security Strategy', also called the Hooda report, which was subsequently integrated into its manifesto.

In March 2021, Chief of Defence Staff General Bipin Rawat, at a talk at the College of Defence Management, stated that "some important steps that we need to take, include-- defining the national security strategy [...]."

The Defence Acquisition Procedure 2020 contains reference to the "National Security Strategy/Guidelines (as and when promulgated)".

See also 
 National Cyber Security Policy 2013

References

Further reading

PK Khup Hangzo, Associate Fellow (10 April 2020) Rethinking National Security in an Age of Pandemics. Vivekananda International Foundation (VIF).
Arvind Gupta (20 October 2011). A National Security Strategy Document for India. Manohar Parrikar Institute for Defense Studies and Analyses (MP-IDSA)
Lt Gen (Retd) AS Lamba. Review: The New Arthashastra: A Security Strategy for India. Institute of Peace and Conflict Studies (IPCS)

Cabinet Secretariat of India
21st century in India
National security policies
National security of India